Hyeminseo was the medical authority of the Joseon Dynasty in Korea. The officers were in charge of the treatment of commoners and medicine.

In 1392, the year of the foundation of Joseon, the organ was established to succeed the Hyemingoguk, the former medical institution of Goryeo. In 1414, its name became Hyeminguk, and then finally changed to the name Hyeminseo in 1466 under the reign of Sejo of Joseon. It was abolished in 1882.

The officers were in charge of producing medicines, teaching disciplines, researching Korean medicine. Generally, four people were put to as the disciplines. Bureaucrats of Hyeminseo were also appointed through the gwageo recruitment examination.

Hyeminseo aimed to benefit the people but its coverage was limited to commoners living in Hanyang (now Seoul). There was another medical authority called Hwalinseo. Collectively, the two were referred to as Yanguisa.

Notes
 Horse Doctor Cho Seung-woo leaves Hyeminseo
 Academy of Korean Studies

1392 establishments in Asia
1882 disestablishments in Asia
1882 in Korea
Government health agencies
Health in Korea
Goryeo
Joseon dynasty